SaGa is a series of role-playing video games developed and published by Square Enix (formerly Square). Its first game premiered in Japan in 1989, and SaGa games have subsequently been localized for markets in North America and Europe across multiple video game consoles since the series debut on the Game Boy with The Final Fantasy Legend. The original Game Boy trilogy was released outside of Japan under the Final Fantasy brand for marketing purposes but was otherwise unrelated to the franchise. Several titles remained exclusive to Japan in their original forms, only coming to other territories with ports or remakes on later platforms. Most games have their own settings and gameplay mechanics. Series creator Akitoshi Kawazu led or advised the development of most of the games.

New SaGa games were released for home and handheld consoles until Unlimited Saga in 2002, after which Square Enix only developed ports and remakes of already released SaGa games until SaGa: Scarlet Grace in 2016. Beginning in 2012 with Emperors SaGa, the series expanded onto mobile and web browsers. Square Enix published one collection of SaGa games, the 2020 Collection of SaGa: Final Fantasy Legend for the Nintendo Switch, containing ports of the original three SaGa games. The series has reached cumulative sales and downloads of over ten million units worldwide as of 2020. The Romancing SaGa trilogy is the best-selling part of the series, with four million copies sold worldwide.

Games

Console games

Mobile and browser games

Collections

References

External links

Lists of video games by franchise
Video games